The Tarawera River is in the Bay of Plenty Region in the North Island of New Zealand.

The Tarawera Falls on the river are considered to be quite spectacular.

Environmental issues

The Tasman Pulp and Paper Mill, now owned by Norske Skog, has been discharging waste into the river since 1955. Local residents have erected signposts labelling the river as the "Black Drain" since the 1990s.

The dark colour is due to the presence of pollution from farms, sewage and stormwater but it is predominantly from pulp and paper mill effluent. As of 1997, pulp and paper mills were discharging over 160 million litres of industrial waste into the river per day. By 2006, the oxygen levels in the river had reached a level where fish could survive, however the water colour was still dark. Since 1998 the colour and light penetration (euphotic depth) have improved in the lower section of the river due to less pollution from the Tasman Mill.

In 2009, the mill gained permission to continue polluting the river for the next 25 years. In 2010, local iwi took a case to the High Court to shorten the 25 year water discharge permits issued under the Resource Management Act but the appeal was rejected.

References

External links
 

Rivers of the Bay of Plenty Region
Water pollution in New Zealand
Rivers of New Zealand